The Yorba Linda Fault or Yorba Linda Trend is a fault system that extends from northeast Yorba Linda, California to the southeastern portion of the Chino Hills and Chino Hills (city), in San Bernardino County, California.

The fault was discovered in the late 1990s and is known to have caused the  5.5 2008 Chino Hills earthquake. The fault is believed to produce a  6.0 earthquake at most.

Seismic faults of California
Geology of Orange County, California
Chino Hills (California)
Chino Hills, California
Yorba Linda, California